Land of the Dead: Road to Fiddler's Green is a first-person shooter licensed video game based on the George A. Romero zombie horror movie Land of the Dead, developed by Brainbox Games and published by Groove Games.

Plot 
The game is a prequel to the Land of the Dead film, taking place during the initial outbreak of the zombie pandemic. Players take on the role of a farmer named Jack, who, one day, finds his farm besieged by the undead. After finding the other nearby farms desolate, he makes his way to the city, hoping to find help, but instead finding the city in ruins, overrun by the undead. Jack later learns about the existence of a safe-haven located within the city, and makes it his priority to reach it.

Gameplay 
Land of the Dead: Road to Fiddler's Green utilizes traditional first-person shooter gameplay. Players can use a variety of either melee weapons or firearms to fight through the zombie hordes. Some weapons are capable of dismembering the zombies, whilst other weapons are not. The zombies' jaws, heads, arms, forearms, and legs can be shot or chopped off by the player. This can very effectively save the player so as to make an escape. The zombies themselves appear in many varieties (regular, ones armed with a melee weapon, crawlers, puking ones, screamers that summon other zombies, and poisonous, exploding ones) and each takes a different number of hits to kill, which varies upon the difficulty setting of the game. The player cannot become a zombie, but it is stated that people who die for any reason become zombies, like in the movie.

The multiplayer component of the game consists of many online game types. These consist of deathmatch, team deathmatch, and "Capture the Flag" modes. There is also an "Invasion" (co-op survival) mode, in which players are trapped in a small map where they must survive for a chosen amount of time. In this mode, the weapons and ammunition regenerate in the same spots each time, allowing the players to dodge the burden of ammunition shortages. Players can pick up melee weapons from recently killed melee weapon wielding zombies as well. In some variants of Invasion maps, players who die or are bitten by zombies become zombies themselves, and try to kill their former teammates.

Development 
Designer Christopher Locke felt that the Living Dead series was "just fantastic from a game design perspective", and took the opportunity that Romero was filming Land of the Dead to consider a tie-in. Brainbox Games had a fully developed single-player PC game before approaching Universal Pictures about a licensing deal. The studio approved it, and worked with the developers to add story elements and environments that would tie it into the movie, such as not including the word "zombie".

Reception 

The game received "unfavorable" reviews on both platforms according to the review aggregation website Metacritic. GameSpots Alex Navarro wrote that the game was "either the most avant-garde piece of gaming artistry to ever find its way to the retail market, or the absolute worst game of the year. Actually, it's probably just the latter." The Xbox version was later chosen by the website as the worst game of 2005.

See also 
 List of zombie video games

References

External links 
 

2005 video games
First-person shooters
Unreal Engine games
Video games based on films
Video games developed in Canada
Windows games
Xbox games
Video games about zombies
Groove Games games
Multiplayer and single-player video games